JLTV may refer to:

 Jewish Life Television (JLTV)
 Jilin Television (JLTV)
 Joint Light Tactical Vehicle, U.S. military general purpose light vehicle, replacing the Humvee jeep
 Lockheed Martin JLTV
 General Tactical Vehicles JLTV Eagle
 BAE Systems JLTV
 Jean-Louis Tixier-Vignancour, French lawyer and politician

See also

HMMWV (High Mobility Multipurpose Wheeled Vehicle), Humvee, Hummer, H0
Light utility vehicle (disambiguation) (Jeep)
Jeep (disambiguation)